Jean-Baptiste Gaultier de la Vérendrye (September 3, 1713 – June 6, 1736) was the eldest son of Pierre Gaultier de Varennes et de La Vérendrye and Marie-Anne Dandonneau Du Sablé. He was born on Île Dupas near Sorel, New France

Jean Baptiste, with three brothers, Pierre Gaultier de La Vérendrye, François de La Vérendrye, and Louis-Joseph Gaultier de La Vérendrye, served in the expedition his father led west in 1731. When they arrived at Fort Kaministiquia some of the engagés (indentured employees), exhausted by the long journey by canoe from Montreal and discouraged by the difficult portages facing them, refused to go on. His  father's second in command, Christopher Dufrost de La Jemeraye and Jean Baptiste led a smaller advance party west to Rainy Lake and established a fort they named Fort St. Pierre (after the parish church where Jean Baptiste was baptised).

The following year Jean Baptiste was instrumental in founding Fort St. Charles on Lake of the Woods and in 1734 he established Fort Maurepas on the Red River.

On June 6, 1736, Sioux Indians ambushed a party led by Jean Baptiste soon after they left Fort St. Charles on Lake of the Woods. They were headed for Fort Kaministiquia to fetch provisions. Jean Baptiste, Father Jean-Pierre Aulneau and 19 other men were massacred. Their bodies were later transported to Fort Saint-Charles and buried in the chapel.

Jean-Baptiste de La Vérendrye's share in the construction of Fort Maurepas makes him one of the founders of the present province of Manitoba.

See also

Sons of Pierre Gaultier de Varennes, sieur de La Vérendrye:
Jean Baptiste de La Vérendrye (b. 1713)
Pierre Gaultier de La Vérendrye (b. 1714)
François de La Vérendrye (b. 1715)
Louis-Joseph Gaultier de La Vérendrye (b. 1717)
 Verendrye Brothers' journey to the Rocky Mountains

References

1713 births
1736 deaths
Explorers of Canada
Explorers of the United States
French explorers of North America
Canadian explorers
People of New France